Leskiola is a genus of parasitic flies in the family Tachinidae. There are at least two described species in Leskiola.

Species
These two species belong to the genus Leskiola:
 Leskiola asiatica (Mesnil, 1957)
 Leskiola palpata Mesnil, 1957

References

Further reading

 
 
 
 

Tachinidae
Articles created by Qbugbot